The Northern Free State Griffons (currently known as the Novavit Griffons for sponsorship reasons) are a South African rugby union team that participates in the annual Currie Cup and Rugby Challenge tournaments. They play out of Welkom at North West Stadium, and draw players from roughly the eastern third of Free State Province (the remainder of the province comprises the territory of the Free State Cheetahs).

The team currently plays in the First Division of the Currie Cup, attracting crowds of around 4,000 to home games in at North West Stadium in Welkom. Their traditional rivals are the Free State Cheetahs and North West Province Leopards.

History
The Griffons rugby union was formed in 1968 when the late Dr Danie Craven, the president of SA rugby, had a vision to spread the game to rural areas in South Africa. The Griffons were one of four new provincial teams formed, originally known as Northern Free State (or Noord Vrystaat in Afrikaans).

In 1996, with the start of professional rugby, the then South African rugby football union, under Louis Luyt, decided to re-divide the unions to have only 14 provinces in South Africa, with Northern Free State being one. The Eastern Free State province was incorporated into Northern Free State. In 1999, Northern Free State changed their name to the Griffons.

Honours
The team's major tournament wins include:
 Currie Cup First Division: 2008, 2014, 2016, 2017 and 2022
 Vodacom Cup: 2001 Vodacom Shield
 Paul Roos Trophy: 1970

Current squad

The following players have been included in the Griffons squad for the 2023 Currie Cup Premier Division:

References

South African rugby union teams
Sport in the Free State (province)
Matjhabeng Local Municipality